Teleta is a genus of moths belonging to the subfamily Olethreutinae of the family Tortricidae. It consists of only one species, Teleta talaris, which is found in Thailand, New Guinea and Java.

The wingspan is 17–19 mm. Adults have a purplish-lilac ground colour.

See also
List of Tortricidae genera

References

External links
tortricidae.com

Olethreutini
Monotypic moth genera
Moths of Asia
Tortricidae genera